The Siemens C72 is a mobile phone based on the C65. It features a built-in camera capable of taking pictures in VGA resolution (640*480 pixels), but is not capable of recording videos (with possible workarounds).

External links
 User Manuals / User Guides for C72 from Manualsmania

C72

Mobile phones introduced in 2005
Mobile phones with infrared transmitter